Thomas Iain Abercrombie (born 5 July 1987) is a New Zealand professional basketball player for the New Zealand Breakers of the Australian National Basketball League (NBL). A product of Westlake Boys High School in Auckland, Abercrombie had a short-lived college basketball stint with Washington State before debuting in the Australian NBL in 2008 with the Breakers. In 2011, he won his first NBL championship and earned Grand Final MVP honours. He went on to win three more championships in 2012, 2013 and 2015. Abercrombie is the Breakers' all-time leading scorer and has the most 3-pointers in club history.

Abercrombie has also played four seasons in the New Zealand NBL, and has had stints aboard in France, Spain and Turkey.

Early life and junior career
Born and raised in Auckland, New Zealand, Abercrombie attended Westlake Boys High School and played four years of school basketball. In 2005, he captained the basketball team to the title at the Secondary School National Championships. That year, he also served as the school's deputy head boy and was captain of the volleyball team.

As a junior, Abercrombie played for the North Harbour Basketball Association and represented New Zealand with the Junior Tall Blacks.

In November 2005, Abercrombie accepted a scholarship deal with Washington State University. He spent two seasons with the Cougars, redshirting his freshman season in 2006–07 before seeing action in 12 games in 2007–08.

Professional career

New Zealand Breakers
After returning home following his college stint, Abercrombie joined the New Zealand Breakers in the Australian NBL as a development player for the 2008–09 season. He played 13 games in his first season with the Breakers, and was elevated to the full squad for the 2009–10 season. He missed four games in the back half of the season with an ankle injury.

In the 2010–11 season, Abercrombie helped the Breakers reach their first ever grand final series, where they defeated the Cairns Taipans 2–1 to win their maiden NBL championship. He was subsequently named the Grand Final MVP. Abercrombie went on to win three more championships with the Breakers in 2012, 2013 and 2015.

In January 2016, Abercrombie passed Kirk Penney as the club's all-time leading scorer. Due to Penney's return to the club for two seasons, Abercrombie had to pass him again in October 2018 to reach 3227 points in 276 games. In February 2019, he played his 300th NBL game.

In October 2019, Abercrombie committed to the Breakers until the end of the 2021–22 season.

In 2019–20, Abercrombie became the second player in NBL history (after Daniel Kickert in 2016–17 and 2017–18) to join the exclusive 50–40–90 club. Abercrombie averaged 12.1 points per game for the season while shooting 50.0 percent from the field, 46.5 percent from three-point range and 90.5 percent from the free throw line.

In April 2021, Abercrombie played his 355th game for the Breakers, surpassing Mika Vukona (354) to become the franchise's all-time games played leader. He also passed Kirk Penney (489) as the club's all-time leader in 3-pointers made.

Abercrombie missed most of the 2021–22 NBL season with a side strain and missed the first month of the 2022–23 NBL season after suffering a torn retina which required emergency surgery.

New Zealand NBL
In 2009, Abercrombie debuted in the New Zealand NBL with the Waikato Pistons. He helped the Pistons win the championship while claiming Rookie of the Year and All-Star Five honours. He continued on with the Pistons in 2010 and earned All-Star Five honours again while helping the Pistons make a second consecutive grand final appearance. He returned to the Pistons for a third season in 2011 and once again earned All-Star Five honours.

In 2019, Abercrombie played half a season with the Wellington Saints and helped them win a championship while claiming Grand Final MVP honours.

Overseas stints
During the 2013 NBL off-season, Abercrombie took part in mini-camp opportunities with NBA teams such as the San Antonio Spurs, Milwaukee Bucks, Houston Rockets and Dallas Mavericks. He then joined the Phoenix Suns for the NBA Summer League.

Following the 2013–14 NBL season, Abercrombie had a stint in France with ASVEL Basket. He went on to have similar post-NBL season stints the following three years, playing for Gipuzkoa Basket in Spain in 2015, and then having two stints in Turkey with Pınar Karşıyaka (2016) and Büyükçekmece Basketbol (2017).

National team career
Abercrombie made his debut for the Tall Blacks in 2006. In 2007, he represented New Zealand at the World University Games. He has been a regular with the Tall Blacks since 2009. In 2018, he won a bronze medal at the Commonwealth Games. In 2019, he played at the FIBA World Cup.

Personal
Abercrombie is the son of Colin and Judy. He is the oldest of three children, with brother Hayden and sister Nicola. Abercrombie and his wife Monique have three children.

Abercrombie studied a Bachelor of Science at Massey University.

References

External links
New Zealand Breakers player profile
Washington State bio
LNB.fr profile
NBL stats

1987 births
Living people
ASVEL Basket players
Basketball players at the 2018 Commonwealth Games
Büyükçekmece Basketbol players
Commonwealth Games bronze medallists for New Zealand
Commonwealth Games medallists in basketball
Gipuzkoa Basket players
Karşıyaka basketball players
Liga ACB players
New Zealand men's basketball players
New Zealand Breakers players
New Zealand expatriate basketball people in France
New Zealand expatriate basketball people in Spain
New Zealand expatriate basketball people in the United States
New Zealand expatriate basketball people in Turkey
People educated at Westlake Boys High School
Shooting guards
Small forwards
Basketball players from Auckland
Waikato Pistons players
Washington State Cougars men's basketball players
Wellington Saints players
2014 FIBA Basketball World Cup players
2010 FIBA World Championship players
2019 FIBA Basketball World Cup players
Medallists at the 2018 Commonwealth Games